Dmitry Pikhno (1853–1913) was a Russian nationalist, economist, jurist-professor, journalist, landowner, and politician (conservative).

Pikhno was born at khutor (farmstead) Nesterovka, Chigirin uyezd, Kiev Governorate. As a student of Nikolai von Bunge, in 1874 he graduated the Kiev University with a degree of candidate of juridical sciences and was a head of the student juridical club. In 1877 Pikhno was a docent, and since 1885 an extraordinary and in 1888-1901 an ordinary professor of the Kiev University department of political science and statistics. He advocated economic theories of the English classical school, theoretician of market competition, capitalist rationalization of industry and agrarian economy, and author of a number of scientific works.

Professor at the Kiev University. Member of State Council (1907–1913), belonged to its right-wing group. Editor of Kievlianin, the nationalist daily newspaper, published in Kiev.

Further reading
Out of My Past: The Memoirs of Count Kokovtsov Edited by H.H. Fisher and translated by Laura Matveev; Stanford University Press, 1935.

References

1853 births
1913 deaths
People from Cherkasy Oblast
People from Chigirinsky Uyezd
Members of the Russian Assembly
Members of the Union of the Russian People
Members of the State Council (Russian Empire)
Russian jurists
Russian journalists
Recipients of the Order of St. Vladimir, 4th class
Recipients of the Order of St. Anna, 1st class
Recipients of the Order of St. Anna, 2nd class
Recipients of the Order of Saint Stanislaus (Russian), 2nd class